Amy Otey (born September 8, 1962), known as Miss Amy is an American musical fitness entertainer, singer-songwriter, and author. She focuses on the themes of health and activity for children, though her genres also range to country, folk-rock and pop. She has released 5 albums, the fifth of which, Fitness Rock & Roll, was nominated in the 54th Grammy Awards. Miss Amy also appears on the 53rd Grammy nominated album Healthy Food For Thought: Good Enough To Eat, and the 54th Grammy winning album, All About Bullies... Big And Small.

She performs frequently with her musical group Miss Amy & Her Big Kids Band, and in 2013 released an album entitled Angels Riding Shotgun with her Americana rock band Off the Map, which features the same line-up of musicians. Her first book, Keep Kids Fit! Classroom Activity Breaks is set to be released in the Fall of 2013 by Open Door Publications.

Early life, education
Amy Lynne Skelton was born on September 8, 1962 in Charleston, South Carolina. She was raised in suburban Kansas City. She has a family history of music – her great-grandmother played piano in movie houses for silent pictures, and her grandfather directed and acted in musical community theater. Her mother also liked to sing and played ragtime piano. Skelton started taking piano lessons in third grade, and in high school she was involved in musical theater and choir competitions. After she met her husband, music producer Alex Otey, they began playing in jazz, folk and rock bands together.

She earned her BBA in Strategic Management at University of North Texas and her Certificate of Gerontology at Rutgers University.

As a fitness instructor she has been accredited for Kids & Teen Fitness, Yoga I & II, Pilates, Tai-Chi, Strength Training, Primary Aerobics and Pre/Post Natal Fitness. She is also a certified Youth/Adolescent Fitness Trainer.

Music career

Early years

She didn't pick up guitar until her late 20s, when she used it to help write music. Her career in children's music began in the mid-1990s, when her first son Phillip was born prematurely. She made up songs to sing for him while he was in the hospital's neonatal, something she continued doing in his early years. As he began bouncing to the rhythm of the words, she continued to structure the songs into a routine for him to follow. In the 1990s she began raising her family in New Jersey. She has stated that "Having a child with severe health needs really changed our family situation and my musical focus. It became all about raising a healthy child."

Months after Phillip was born, she became active in a local mom's group. After singing with moms and their children at gatherings, she was soon asked to provide entertainment at libraries, holiday events and birthday parties. She then trained as a children's music instructor, and began to develop her interactive program. She also continued training in Kids & Teen Fitness, Primary Aerobics, Yoga and Tai-Chi.

Miss Amy was the moniker given to her by students when she first started teaching. Her programs focus on the ABC's of fitness skills; agility, balance, and coordination.

After becoming a President's Challenge Advocate in 2007, she was named President's Challenge All-American for September 2010 by the President's Challenge Program.

Miss Amy and Her Big Kids' Band
Miss Amy frequently plays live with Miss Amy & Her Big Kids' Band. The members have each earned their President's Active Life Style Awards and are experienced musicians who have performed rock, jazz, funk and classical music.

Current members
Miss Amy – vocals, guitar
Alex Otey – trumpet, keyboard, vocals
Ryan Ross – percussion
Chris Clark – double bass, etc.
James Popik – electric guitar, etc.

Solo releases
As a singer-songwriter Miss Amy has released 5 LPs, starting with Underwater in 2004. She typically writes both words and music, then arranges and adds instruments with producer Alex Otey. Her albums have been nominated for several Grammy awards. In late 2010 Healthy Food For Thought, which features her two spoken word pieces, "Bananas" and "Imagine a Garden," was nominated for a 53rd Grammy Award in the "Children's Best Spoken Word" category.

Miss Amy performed as part of the White House 2010 Egg Roll event on April 5, 2010 where the theme was based on the Let's Move! initiative of First Lady Michelle Obama. Other performers at the 2010 White House Egg Roll event included Justin Bieber, J.K. Rowling, and the cast from Glee. Miss Amy also headlined Kidstock 2010.

2011's Miss Amy's Fitness Rock & Roll was produced by Otey's husband and co-creator, Alex, and released on his label, Ionian Productions. The album features James Popik on guitar and vocals, Chris Clark on bass, Andy Janowiak and Rick Vinet on percussion, saxophonists Richie Cole and Tom Verde, and brass player Lars Wendt.

In November 2011 Fitness Rock & Roll was nominated for a 54th Grammy Award in the category of "Best Children's Album." That year Miss Amy also appeared on the Grammy-winning album All About Bullies... Big And Small. By December 2011 she had won The Lehigh Valley Music Award's "Best Children's Performer." She has appeared on television spots such as NBC 10!, and in March 2013 Shine On Hollywood Magazine presented her as one of the "Top Women Entertainment Industry Professionals."

She is to release the book Keep Kids Fit! Classroom Activity Breaks in the fall of 2013 by Open Door Publications.

Off The Map
In 2013 she released Angels Riding Shotgun, the debut album of the Americana rock band Off the Map With Miss Amy. The band has the same lineup as Miss Amy and Her Big Kids Band.

Miss Amy is an active member of the National Academy of Recording Arts & Sciences and the Americana Music Association.

Personal life
Miss Amy continues to live in West Trenton, New Jersey with her family.

Discography

Miss Amy and Her Big Kids Band
Underwater (2004)
Wide Wide World (2005)
My Precious One (2006)
I Wanna Know How It Works! (2007)
Fitness Rock & Roll (2010)

Off the Map with Miss Amy
Angels Riding Shotgun (2013)

Compilations
WXPN's Kids' Corner 20th Anniversary Compilation (2008)
Wildflower Compilation (2010)
Healthy Food For Thought, Good Enough to Eat (2010)
All About Bullies... Big And Small Compilation (2011)
Move This World (2013)

DVDs
International Baby 101 DVD (2003)

Grammy Awards

Publishing history
Keep Kids Fit! Classroom Activity Breaks Volume 1 Fitness Rock & Roll (2013, Open Door Publications)

References

External links

MissAmyKids.com
Miss Amy on Facebook (Official)
Miss Amy and Her Big Kids Band on YouTube

1962 births
Living people
American women singer-songwriters
American children's musicians
American children's musical groups
American folk musicians
Musicians from Charleston, South Carolina
21st-century American women
Singer-songwriters from South Carolina